Fractal Design is a computer hardware manufacturer from Sweden. Founded in 2007, the company manufactures computer cases, water coolers, case fans, and power supplies. All products are designed and engineered in Sweden.

In recent years the company's products have won several awards in computer hardware industry such as the Case Manufacturer of the Year (2013–2015), European Hardware Awards (2015) and Brand of the year IXBT.com (2015), Russia.

The company headquarters of Fractal Design is located in Gothenburg, Sweden, where the products are designed. Fractal Design manufactures all their products in China. To support its international operations, Fractal Design has offices in Europe, North America and Asia.

History 
Fractal Design was founded in Gothenburg, Sweden, in 2007. In 2009, international recognition for the company grew after the first computer case within the Define series was introduced. In the same year, the company opened a North America office in Dallas, Texas. A few months later, an Asia office was established to handle increased Product Development and Sales.

By the end of 2016, the company continued to develop the concepts of Scandinavian design, silent computing and support of powerful computer configurations by launching new computer cases under the Define series.

In 2020, Fractal products are available in more than 50 countries. Fractal remains one of the world's premier brands when it comes to designing and manufacturing cases, fans, power supplies and accessories for gaming- and hardware enthusiasts with high expectations.

Products 
The company's products include:

 Power supplies 

 Water cooling

See also 
 List of computer hardware manufacturers

References

External links 

Computer enclosure companies
Computer power supply unit manufacturers
Manufacturing companies based in Gothenburg
Swedish brands
Manufacturing companies established in 2007
Swedish companies established in 2007